The 2009 BH Telecom Indoors was a professional tennis tournament played on indoor hard courts. It was part of the 2009 ATP Challenger Tour. It took place in Sarajevo, Bosnia and Herzegovina between 23 and 29 March 2009.

Singles entrants

Seeds

Rankings are as of March 16, 2009.

Other entrants
The following players received wildcards into the singles main draw:
  Mirza Bašić
  Ismar Gorčić
  Aldin Šetkić
  Ivan Zovko

The following players received entry from the qualifying draw:
 Henri Kontinen
 Nikola Mektić
 Sebastian Rieschick
 Goran Tošić

Champions

Men's singles

 Ivan Dodig def.  Dominik Meffert, 6–4, 6–3

Men's doubles

 Konstantin Kravchuk /  Dawid Olejniczak def.  James Auckland /  Rogier Wassen, 6–2, 3–6, [10–7]

External links
 

BH Telecom Indoors
BH Telecom Indoors
2009 in Bosnia and Herzegovina sport